Juan Martín del Potro was the defending champion, but chose not to participate that year.

Jérémy Chardy won in the final 1–6, 6–3, 6–4 against Victor Hănescu.

Seeds

Draw

Finals

Top half

Bottom half

External links
Main draw
Qualifying draw

Stuttgart Open Singles
Singles 2009